The Ahmed Hamdi Tunnel is a 1640 metre long car tunnel under the Suez Canal, at Shallufa.  The tunnel is named after Ahmed Hamdi, an Egyptian engineer and general killed in action during the October War.  It has two lanes of traffic, one in each direction, and connects the Asian Sinai Peninsula to the town of Suez on the African mainland.

Construction
It was originally constructed as a shield tunnel by Tarmac Construction in November 1981. In 1992, the Japanese government granted aid to a project aimed at rehabilitating the tunnel which had developed leaks. It is 1.63 km long and has an outside diameter of 11.6 m. The tunnel reaches a maximum depth of 51 m (167 feet) below ground level.

Significant developments in the region
The tunnel was part of a major drive to develop the areas surrounding the Suez Canal, including other projects such as  the Suez Canal overhead line crossing (completed in 1998), the El Ferdan Railway Bridge, and the Suez Canal Bridge (completed in 2001).

See also 
 Trans-African Highway network

References

External links 

 Ahmed Hamdi Tunnel

Roads in Egypt
Suez Canal
Tunnels in Egypt
Tunnels completed in 1983
Road tunnels in Africa